This is a list of electricity-generating power stations in the U.S. state of Wyoming, sorted by type and name. In 2019, Wyoming had a total summer capacity of 8,667 MW through all of its power plants, and a net generation of 42,146 GWh.  The corresponding electrical energy generation mix was 83.9% coal, 9.9% wind, 3.4% natural gas (including up to 0.9% other petroleum gases and 0.1% petroleum liquids), 2.4% hydroelectric and 0.4% solar.  Small-scale solar which includes customer-owned photovoltaic panels delivered in additional net 9 GWh to Wyoming's electrical grid.  This compares as one-twentieth the amount generated by the state's first utility-scale solar PV facility which entered into service the prior year.

Wyoming had the smallest population in the U.S. in 2019, and three-fifths of its electricity generation was sent to nearby western states.  It contains more than one-third of the nation's recoverable coal reserves, accounted for two-fifths of all related U.S. mining activity, and exported much of its low-sulfur coal to power plants in 29 other states.  Wyoming also mined and exported nearly all the uranium used to fuel the nation's fleet of nuclear power stations.  These activities have declined somewhat in recent years while extraction of Wyoming's oil and gas reserves continued to expand.

Nuclear power stations
Wyoming had no utility-scale nuclear facilities in 2019.  In June 2021, Terrapower and Pacificorp announced their intention to advance a novel reactor demonstration project at the site of a retiring coal plant in Wyoming. On 16 November 2021, Pacificorp announced the selection of the Naughton Power Plant in Kemmerer, Wyoming for the Natrium Demonstration Project.

Fossil-fuel power stations
Data from the U.S. Energy Information Administration serves as a general reference.

Coal

Natural gas

Other petroleum gases

Petroleum liquids

Renewable power stations
Data from the U.S. Energy Information Administration serves as a general reference.

Biomass and industrial waste

 Waste heat from phosphate fertilizer manufacturing.

Geothermal
Wyoming had no utility-scale geothermal facilities in 2019.  The state is home to Yellowstone National Park and Hot Springs State Park.  It had a number of small-scale geothermal installations used mostly to heat buildings.

Hydroelectric

Solar

Wind

The Chokecherry and Sierra Madre Wind Energy Project with a planned capacity of up to 3,000 MW generated by about 1,000 turbines is under construction in Carbon County and scheduled for completion in 2026.   It would be the largest wind farm in the U.S. upon completion, and would serve the western U.S. market thru planned new HVDC transmission capacity.

Battery storage facilities
Wyoming had no utility-scale battery storage facilities in 2019.

References

Energy in Wyoming
 
Wyoming
Lists of buildings and structures in Wyoming